Menno is a given name.

It may also refer to:

Places
 Menno Community Hall, Kendall, Kansas, USA

Places named after the Mennonites
 Menno Colony, Paraguay
 Menno Township, Pennsylvania, USA
 Menno Township, Marion County, Kansas, USA
 Menno, South Dakota, USA

Other uses
 MennoMedia, Mennonite Church

See also

 Menno Township (disambiguation)
 
 Mennonite
 Mennon

 Meno (disambiguation)